Jagiroad College, established in 1979, is a general degree college situated at Jagiroad in Morigaon district, Assam. This college is affiliated with the Gauhati University. This college offers different courses in arts, commerce and science.

Culturally it lies very close to Na-Khola—the abode of the Prince Regent of the ancient Kingdom of the Tiwas –one of the tribes of the state endowed with its distinctive indigenous life-world. Jagiroad College was established by a group of foresighted and committed social-workers of the region.

References

External links
http://www.jagiroadcollege.co.in

Universities and colleges in Assam
Colleges affiliated to Gauhati University
Educational institutions established in 1979
1979 establishments in Assam